Loton may refer to:

 Loton Park - Loton Park is a country house near Alberbury, Shrewsbury in Shropshire
 Loton - A Village in Ambala District, near Naraingarh
People
 William Loton (1838–1924), banker and politician in Western Australia